The 1931 Manchester Ardwick by-election was held on 22 June 1931.  The by-election was held due to the death of the incumbent Labour MP, Thomas Lowth.  It was won by the Labour candidate Joseph Henderson.

Previous election

Result

Aftermath
Henderson's victory was short-lived. At the general election later in the year he was  defeated by the Conservative Albert Fuller by over 5,000 votes. However he would regain the seat when he successfully challenged Fuller at the 1935 general election.

References

Manchester Ardwick by-election
Manchester Ardwick by-election
Manchester Ardwick by-election
Ardwick, 1931
1930s in Manchester